Out of My Mind is an upcoming American drama film based on the novel Out of My Mind by Sharon Draper. It directed by Amber Sealey and written by Daniel Stiepleman. The film stars Phoebe-Rae Taylor (in her screen debut), Rosemarie DeWitt, Luke Kirby and Judith Light.

Cast and characters
 Phoebe-Rae Taylor as Melody Brooks
 Rosemarie DeWitt as Diane
 Luke Kirby as Chuck
 Judith Light as Mrs. V.
 Michael Chernus as Mr. Dimming
 Courtney Taylor as Dr. Katherine Post
 Emily Mitchell as Penny Brooks

Production
In April 2015,  it was reported that the novel will adapt for screen and will produce by Dan Angel. In May 2022, it was reported that a film adaptation of the novel Out of My Mind by Sharon Draper is in development for Disney+ with Daniel Siepleman as writer, Amber Sealey as director and Phoebe-Rae Taylor set to star. In July 2022, Rosemarie DeWitt, Luke Kirby and Judith Light was cast in the leading roles alongside Taylor. Production began in Toronto later that month.

References

External links

Upcoming English-language films
Upcoming films
Films shot in Toronto
Walt Disney Pictures films
Disney+ original films